Mario Fermín Cabral y Báez (Baní, 1877–Santo Domingo, 1961) was a politician from the Dominican Republic. He was Senator for the Province of Santiago, and also the President of the Senate of the Dominican Republic three times: 1914–1916, 1930–1938, 1955.

Career
During his tenure as senator he drafted the bill that in 1935 renamed the Dominican capital, Santo Domingo, Trujillo City in honor of dictator Rafael Trujillo; he also promoted in 1943 the construction of Centro de Los Heroes in the capital city.

Family
Cabral y Báez was the son of Marcos Antonio Cabral y Figueredo and Altagracia Amelia Báez Andújar (daughter of President Buenaventura Báez). On 24 November 1900, Cabral y Báez married Amelia Josefa Tavares Saviñón and they had four children: María Estela, Pura Amelia, Manuel Antonio and Ramón Cabral Tavares. After his first wife died, Cabral y Báez married María Josefa Tavares Tineo and they had one daughter, Altagracia Amelia Cabral Tavares. With Sixta América Stéfani, an Italian-Dominican, he had another daughter, Dulce Enilda Altagracia Cabral Stéfani (1925–2008).

References 

1877 births
1961 deaths
Descendants of Buenaventura Báez
Dominican Republic people of French descent
Dominican Republic people of Galician descent
Dominican Republic people of Portuguese descent
Dominican Republic people of Spanish descent
Presidents of the Senate of the Dominican Republic
White Dominicans
Children of national leaders
20th-century Dominican Republic politicians